Break Dance (also known as Breakdance) is a Commodore 64 rhythm game that relies on players making dancing moves that resemble the classic game Simon says. The game capitalized on early 1980s-era b-boying, which was a popular trend in American culture. The game was inspired by the films Flashdance and Beat Street.

Gameplay
A computer character performs a pattern of five break dancing moves that must be copied by the player. One new move is added to every round, making the game more complicated as the player progresses through each stage.

See also 
Space Channel 5

References

1984 video games
Breakdance
Commodore 64 games
Commodore 64-only games
Epyx games
Multiplayer and single-player video games
Dance video games
Video games developed in the United States